Arachnophobiac is the eleventh full-length studio album recorded by the various M.S.G. lineups and the eighth studio album by the German hard rock band Michael Schenker Group released in 2003. After leaving UFO, rumors spread about Schenker's health and well-being, but he put them to rest with an extensive tour, and an all-new solo release. The album was recorded with Michael Schenker on guitars, Chris Logan on vocals, Stuart Hamm on bass guitar and Jeremy Colson on drums.

Track listing
All music by Michael Schenker, all lyrics and vocal melodies by Chris Logan

 "Evermore" – 5:22 
 "Illusion" – 5:24
 "Arachnophobiac" – 4:46 
 "Rock and Roll Believer" – 4:07
 "Sands of Time" – 4:38
 "Weathervane" – 5:02
 "Over Now" – 5:47
 "One World" – 4:06
 "Break the Cycle" – 3:50 
 "Alive" – 4:50
 "Fatal Strike" – 4:25

Personnel

Band members
 Chris Logan - vocals
 Michael Schenker - guitars, producer
 Stuart Hamm - bass
 Jeremy Colson - drums

Additional musicians
 Jeff Watson - lead guitar on tracks 3, 5, 7 and 9
 Jeff Okolowicz - bass on track 9

Production
 Mike Varney - producer
 Steve Fontano - producer, engineer
 Dave Stephens - graphic design

Charts

References

2003 albums
Michael Schenker Group albums
Albums produced by Mike Varney
Shrapnel Records albums